The Autodrom Moscow is a race track located near Moscow,  from Moscow Circuit Road and  from the city center. The track is constructed in the Miachkovo Airport area which has been in use for motor racing since 2001. After the total reconstruction in 2005, it was the only racing facility in Russia until the Red Ring circuit has been opened in Siberia in 2007. The track design satisfies to FIA Grade III requirements. The raceway equipped with 18 pit boxes, 13×6 m each, race control tower with AMB time keeping system, grandstands for 2000 spectators and a small hotel.

The Autodrom Moscow has unique feature: is allows racing both clockwise and counterclockwise. Main grandstand have 800 seats. The track is in use not only for sports but also for amateur driving and corporate events.

Lap records
The official race lap records at the Autodrom Moscow are listed as:

See also
 Moscow Raceway

References

External links
 
Track-days at Moscow Ring 

Motorsport venues in Russia
Buildings and structures in Moscow
Sports venues in Moscow